Senator Goebel may refer to:

Louis S. Goebel (1839–1915), New York State Senate
William Goebel (1856–1900), Kentucky State Senate